The 2010 California gubernatorial election was held November 2, 2010 to elect the Governor of California. The primary elections were held on June 8, 2010. Because constitutional office holders in California have been prohibited from serving more than two terms in the same office since November 6, 1990, incumbent Republican Arnold Schwarzenegger was term-limited and thus was ineligible to run for re-election to a third term. Former Governor Jerry Brown, to whom the term limits did not apply due to a grandfather clause, defeated Meg Whitman in the general election. Brown was sworn into office on January 3, 2011. As of 2023, this is the last time the Governor’s office in California changed partisan control.

Republican primary

Candidates
 Bill Chambers, railroad switchman
 Douglas Hughes, retired business owner
 Ken Miller, former broadcast manager
 Steven Mozena (write-in candidate)
 Lawrence Naritelli, accountant and controller
 Robert Newman, psychologist and farmer
 Steve Poizner, businessman and then-California Insurance Commissioner
 David Tully-Smith, primary care physician
 Meg Whitman, businesswoman, former CEO of eBay

Polling

Results

Democratic primary

Candidates

Declared
 Richard Aguirre, businessman
 Jerry Brown, incumbent California Attorney General and former Governor of California
 Lowell Darling, independent artist
 Vibert Greene, mechanical engineer and CEO
 Charles Pineda, parole board judge
 Peter Schurman, non-profit organization consultant who dropped out of the race
 Nadia Smalley (write-in candidate)
 Joe Symmon, president of a non-profit organization

Declined
 Dianne Feinstein, U.S. Senator
 Gavin Newsom, Mayor of San Francisco (ran for Lieutenant Governor)

Polling

Results

American Independent primary

Candidates
 Chelene Nightingale, business owner
 Markham Robinson, owner of a software firm

Results

Green primary

Candidates
 S. Deacon Alexander, student
 Laura Wells, financial systems consultant

Results

Libertarian primary

Candidates
 Jordan Llamas, Doctor of Psychology and Political Science
 Dale Ogden, business consultant and actuary

Results

Peace and Freedom primary

Candidates
 Stewart Alexander, political consultant and former vice presidential candidate for Socialist Party USA
 Carlos Alvarez, retail worker
 Mohammad Arif, businessman

Results

General election

Campaign

Both Whitman and Brown were criticized for negative campaigning during the election. During their final debate at the 2010 Women's Conference a week before the election, moderator Matt Lauer asked both candidates to pull attack ads for the rest of the election, which elicited loud cheers from the audience. Brown agreed and picked one ad each of his and Whitman's that he thought, if Whitman would agree, should be the only ones run, but Whitman, who had been loudly cheered earlier as the prospective first woman governor of the state, was booed when she stated that she would keep "the ads that talk about where Gov. Brown stands on the issues."

The Los Angeles Times reported that nearly $250 million was spent on the Governor's race. At least two spending records were broken during the campaign. Whitman broke personal spending records by spending $140 million of her own money on the campaign, and independent expenditures exceeded $31.7 million, with almost $25 million of that spent in support of Brown.

In an interview with CNN, the reporter opined that Whitman was hurt most during the campaign by a matter involving Nicky Diaz, her former Mexican maid, whom Whitman fired after Diaz asked for help as she was an illegal immigrant.

Candidates' stances on issues

 Jobs:
Meg Whitman 
1. Eliminate small business start-up tax ($800 fee for new business start-ups) 
2. Eliminate factory tax 
3. Increase R&D tax credit (increase from 15% to 20%) 
4. Promote investments in agriculture 
5. Eliminate the state tax on capital gains 

Jerry Brown

1. Stimulate clean energy jobs (build 12,000MW of localized electricity generation; build 8,000MW of large-scale renewables; appoint a Clean Energy Czar) 
2. Invest in infrastructure/construction jobs (federal dollars for projects; prioritize water needs; high-speed rail; strengthen the port system; prioritize use of existing funds for job creation; infill development 
3. Create strike team to focus on job retention 
4. Cut regulations (speed up regulatory processes and eliminate duplicative functions; develop CEQA guidelines; fully utilize administrative law; update outdated technology systems 
5. Increase manufacturing jobs 
6. Deliver targeted workforce training programs 
7. Invest in education

 Education:
Meg Whitman 
1. Direct more money to classroom 
2. Reward outstanding teachers 
3. Eliminate cap on charter schools 
4. Grade public schools A-F 
5. Establish fast-track parent process for charter school conversions 
6. Invest $1 billion in UC and CSU University systems 
7. Utilize alternative paths to the classroom to attract high quality teachers

Jerry Brown

1. Higher education (create new state master plan; focus on community colleges and transfer credits)
2. Overhaul state testing program
3. Change school funding formulas and consolidate the 62 existing categorical programs
4. Teacher recruitment and training
5. Simplify the Education Code and return more decision-making to local school districts
6. A more balanced and creative school curriculum (science, history, and humanities; experiment with online, etc.)
7. Place special emphasis on teaching science, technology, engineering, and math
8. Increase proficiency in English
9. Improve high school graduation rates
10. Charter schools
11. Magnet or theme schools 
12. Citizenship and character

Predictions

Polling

Results

See also

2010 United States gubernatorial elections

References

External links
http://www.ppic.org/content/pubs/survey/S_910MBS.pdf
California Secretary of State - Elections
California State Offices at Project Vote Smart
Campaign contributions for 2010 California Governor from Follow the Money
2010 California Gubernatorial General Election: All Head-to-Head Matchups graph of multiple polls from Pollster.com
Election 2010: California Governor from Rasmussen Reports
2010 California Governor - Whitman vs. Brown from Real Clear Politics
2010 California Governor's Race from CQ Politics
Race Profile in The New York Times
2010 Governor's Race in the Los Angeles Times, endorsement for Brown (October 3)
California Governor Race 2010 in The Sacramento Bee, endorsement for Brown (October 3)
California Elections 2010 in the San Francisco Chronicle, endorsement for Brown (October 3)
2010 California Governor's Race in the San Jose Mercury News, endorsement for Brown (October 10)
Debates
California Republican Gubernatorial Primary Debate on C-SPAN, May 2, 2010
California Gubernatorial Debate, C-SPAN, September 28, 2010
Official campaign sites
Carlos Alvarez
Jerry Brown
Chelene Nightingale
Dale Ogden
Laura Wells
Meg Whitman

Primary candidates:
Richard Aguirre
S. Deacon Alexander
Stewart Alexander
Mohammad Arif
Jerry Brown
Bill Chambers
Lowell Darling
Vibert Greene
Douglas Hughes
Ken Miller
Steven Mozena
Lawrence Naritelli
Robert Newman
Chelene Nightingale
Charles Pineda
Steve Poizner
Peter Schurman
Joe Symmon
David Tully-Smith
Laura Wells

Gubernatorial
2010
2010 United States gubernatorial elections
2010